Sonný Lára Þráinsdóttir (born 9 December 1986) is an Icelandic former footballer who played as a goalkeeper.

Career

Club
Sonný Lára started career in 2002 with Fjölnir. Despite being a goalkeeper, she scored 5 goals during the 2013 season as Fjölnir's designated penalty taker. By 2017, she recorded 107 appearances in the league, for three different teams.

In January 2021, Sonný announced her retirement from football.

International
Sonný Lára started her international career on 15 January 2015, in a match for Iceland U23 against Poland. On 14 February 2016, she debuted for Iceland Senior Team in a tie again against Poland. On 22 June 2017, she was included by coach Freyr Alexandersson on the group of 23 women who represented Iceland at the UEFA Women's Euro 2017.

References

External links
 
 
 
 

1986 births
Living people
Sonný Lára Thráinsdóttir
Sonný Lára Thráinsdóttir
Women's association football goalkeepers
Sonný Lára Thráinsdóttir
Sonný Lára Thráinsdóttir
UEFA Women's Euro 2017 players